Tower of Mirian is a tower built by the King of Georgia Mirian III in the 4th century. It is located on territory of Samtavro Monastery.

Famous Georgian monk Gabriel during his last years lived in the tower of King Mirian.

See also 
 City of Mtskheta
 Starets
 Monasticism
 Hesychasm
 Eastern Orthodox Church
 List of Christian mystics
 Thaumaturgy

Mtskheta
Religious sites in Georgia (country)
Towers in Georgia (country)
Georgian Orthodox monasteries
Georgian Orthodox churches in Mtskheta
Tourist attractions in Mtskheta-Mtianeti